Olivar is a commune in Chile, located in the O'Higgins Region, 10 km south of Rancagua, and administered by the municipality of Olivar. The main economic activities range from agriculture and food production, especially apples for exportation.

Demographics
Of these, 7,898 (64%) lived in urban areas and 4,437 (36%) in rural areas. The population grew by 8.9% (1,003 persons) between the 1992 and 2002 censuses.

Administration
As a commune, Olivar is a third-level administrative division of Chile administered by a municipal council, headed by an alcalde (mayor) who is directly elected every four years. The 2012-2016 mayor is Maria Estrella Montero Carrasco.

Within the electoral divisions of Chile, Olivar is represented in the Chamber of Deputies by Ricardo Rincón  (PDC) and Felipe Letelier (PPD) as part of the 33rd electoral district, together with Mostazal, Graneros, Codegua, Machalí, Requínoa, Rengo, Doñihue, Coinco, Coltauco, Quinta de Tilcoco and Malloa. The commune is represented in the Senate by Alejandro García-Huidobro (UDI) and Juan Pablo Letelier (PS) as part of the 9th senatorial constituency (O'Higgins Region).

Notable people
 José Hipólito Salas y Toro (1812-1883), bishop of Concepción.

References

External links
  Municipality of Olivar

Communes of Chile
Populated places in Cachapoal Province